Nossa Senhora da Lapa is a freguesia (civil parish) of Cape Verde. It covers the smaller northwestern part of the municipality of Ribeira Brava, on the island of São Nicolau.

Subdivisions
The freguesia consists of the following settlements (population at the 2010 census):
 Covoada (pop: 155)
 Estância de Brás (pop: 320)
 Fajã de Baixo (pop: 620, town)
 Queimadas (pop: 299)
 Ribeira Funda (pop: 1)

References

Ribeira Brava, Cape Verde
Parishes of Cape Verde